Domingo Flores Panganiban, also known as Ding Panganiban, (born August 9, 1939) is a Filipino government official and former basketball consultant, team manager and coach.

Early life and education
Panganiban was born on August 9, 1939, in Tanauan, Batangas. He graduated Bachelor of Science in agriculture from the University of the Philippines Los Baños in 1961. He also finished his master's degree in public administration in University of the Philippines Manila in 1970.

Government career
He worked as plant pest control worker, plant pest control officer and later as farm supervisor in Bureau of Plant Industry. He also headed the said bureau from 1975 to 1986. From 1973 to 1986, Panganiban became the executive director of National Food and Agriculture Council (now National Nutrition Council). He also served as Deputy Minister of Agriculture and Food from 1984 to 1986, where he became one of the proponents of the Masagana 99 program.

In 1996, President Fidel V. Ramos appointed Panganiban as the Presidential Assistant for Agriculture. In that same year, he served as Undersecretary for Agriculture until 2001.

From 2000 to 2001, he was appointed as the administrator of the National Food Authority.

He served as Secretary of Agriculture from 2001 and again from 2005 to 2006. He then became the chief of staff of Senator Loren Legarda from 2001 to 2004. He was appointed as lead convenor of National Anti-Poverty Commission from 2006 to 2010.

On August 15, 2022, President Bongbong Marcos appointed him as the Undersecretary for Agriculture.

Coaching career
After the People Power Revolution, Panganiban was tapped as the team manager and consultant of Purefoods in Philippine Basketball Association (PBA). He briefly acted as head coach of the team in 1992 after the resignation of Ely Capacio.

References

External links

|-

|-

1939 births
Living people
Filipino men's basketball coaches
Magnolia Hotshots coaches
People from Batangas
Secretaries of Agriculture of the Philippines
Arroyo administration cabinet members
Estrada administration cabinet members
University of the Philippines Manila alumni
University of the Philippines Los Baños alumni